Erik Karapetyan (born 5 June 1988), better known as simply Erik, is an Armenian singer-songwriter. He represented Armenia in the 2011 New Wave international contest for young performers and achieved fifth place. He also won "Audience's Choice" of that competition. In 2016, he became one of the jury members of the Armenian X-Factor.

Life and career

Early life

Karapetyan was born on 5 June 1988 in Tbilisi. In 2005, he graduated from Tbilisi's Dzabatdze N79 Georgian School, in which he subsequently studied violin, and after the graduation he transferred to Yerevan. There, he started to study in the Komitas State Conservatory of Yerevan until 2011.

Career 
In 2021, he won the first edition of Masquerade, the Armenian version of the Masked Singer contest.

Discography 
 Your Footprints (2015)
 Siro Pandemia (2020)

Filmography

Awards and achievements 
Karapetyan has received these awards:

References

External links
 Official site 
 bravo.am article
 armstar.am article
 armtimes.com article

Living people
Musicians from Yerevan
21st-century Armenian male singers
Armenian pop singers
Georgian people of Armenian descent
1988 births
Masked Singer winners